Bomb The Suburbs is a collection of essays by William Upski Wimsatt, a former graffiti tagger. It is a mix of storytelling, journalism, photojournalism and original research, on a broad range of topics, such as suburban sprawl, hip hop culture, youth activism, graffiti, and Chicago. The first edition had 3,000 copies.

Bomb The Suburbs led to subsequent books and political activism. In an essay in his No More Prisons compilation, entitled "In Defense of Rich Kids", Wimsatt responded to classist criticism of his affluent background:

References 

History of youth
1994 non-fiction books
Soft Skull Press books
American essay collections